The Story Of John M'Neil was Britain's first public health education film, produced in 1911 by Dr Halliday Sutherland. It was a silent film which dramatised a Scottish family living in slum housing and showed how tuberculosis was spread between family members, as well as how it was treated.

Several copies of the film were produced in the 35 mm format suitable for projection in cinemas. Only 22 minutes long, the film was aimed at mass audiences who regularly flocked to the relatively new and hugely popular form of entertainment, the cinema.

Copies of the film were acquired by the National Film Library and are held in its collection.

The film commences with this message:

This statement reflected Dr Sutherland's view that tuberculosis was primarily caused by infection, a view that was not universally accepted at the time. Mainstream medicine regarded susceptibility to tuberculosis as passed down by heredity; mainstream eugenicists regarded the tuberculous as "racially diseased".

The film depicts a "tuberculosis nest" - a tenement block in which the disease thrived. The opening scene shows Mrs M'Neil in her flat. She has consumption in an advanced stage. The family (John M'Neil, a printer, and their two daughters and son) arrive home for (presumably) the evening meal. The vectors of transmission of the disease are shown: sweeping up dust, coughing, spitting and sharing drinking vessels.

All members of the family are infected with TB and, when the oldest daughter visits the Tuberculosis dispensary, the "Edinburgh System" for the treatment, cure and prevention of the disease is applied. The remainder of the film shows the various treatments applied to people with different stages of the disease.

At the time the film was made, the hospitals in which the urban poor might be treated did not want them on the basis that they would expose their existing patients to TB. If the sufferer was out of work, one option might be the poor house, which had grave social stigma attached. "The story of John M'Neil" provided hope to those at threat and suffering from TB that they could be cured and that care would be provided in a humane manner.

The film depicts the "Edinburgh System" devised by Dr Robert Philip including an "open-air" school, open-air shelters, a sanatorium and a tuberculosis dispensary.

References

 "Obituary: Halliday G Sutherland, M.D." Br Med J. 30 Apr 1960; 1(5182): 1368–1369.
 British Film Institute http://collections-search.bfi.org.uk/web/Details/ChoiceFilmWorks/150026759 viewed on 11 August 2014
 "The National Film Library. Recent Acquisitions" The Times, 18 May 1937

Public health in the United Kingdom
1911 films
1911 in the United Kingdom
Tuberculosis
British silent films
British black-and-white films
Films about health care